The list of pastoral visits of Pope Paul VI details the travels of the first pope to leave Italy since 1809, representing the first ever papal pilgrimage to the Holy Land and the first papal visit to the Americas, Africa, Oceania, and Asia. He visited six continents, and was the most-travelled pope in history to that time, earning the nickname "the Pilgrim Pope". With his travels he opened new avenues for the papacy, which were continued by his successors Popes John Paul II, Benedict XVI and Francis. He traveled to the Holy Land in 1964 where he met with Ecumenical Patriarch Athenagoras I in Jerusalem which led to rescinding the excommunications of the Great Schism, which took place in 1054. The Pope also traveled to the Eucharistic Congresses in Bombay, India and Bogotá, Colombia. The first papal visit to the United States occurred on October 4, 1965, when Paul VI visited New York City to address the United Nations at the invitation of Secretary-General U Thant. During that visit, the Pope first stopped at St. Patrick's Cathedral where some 55,000 people lined the streets to greet him, met with President Lyndon B. Johnson at the Waldorf Astoria, addressed the United Nations General Assembly, celebrated Mass at Yankee Stadium, and viewed Michelangelo's Pieta at the New York World's Fair in Queens. Fifty years after the first apparition of Our Lady of Fátima, he visited the shrine in Fátima, Portugal in 1967. He undertook a pastoral visit to Africa in 1969. After a 1970 trip to several Asian and Pacific nations, he made no additional international trips. He died August 6, 1978.

Visits

Outside Italy

In Italy

 August 11, 1964: Orvieto
Pilgrimage on the occasion of the 700th anniversary of the bull "Transiturus".
 October 24, 1964: Montecassino
 June 10, 1965: Pisa
The Pope attended the National Eucharistic Congress.
 September 1, 1966: Alatri, Fumone, Ferentino and Anagni
 September 11, 1966: Carpineto Romano and Colleferro
 December 24, 1966: Florence
The Pope visited Florence, affected by severe flooding on November 4 of that year.
 December 24 and 25, 1968: Taranto
 April 24, 1970: Cagliari
 September 3, 1971: Albano
 September 8, 1971: Subiaco
 September 16, 1972: Udine, Venice and Aquileia
The Pope attended the National Eucharistic Congress in Udine.
 December 24, 1972: Ponzano Romano and Sant'Oreste
 September 14, 1974: Aquino
 August 8, 1976: Bolsena
The pope visited Bolsena on the occasion of the closing of the International Eucharistic Congress in Philadelphia.
 September 17, 1977: Pescara
The Pope attended the National Eucharistic Congress.

See also
 List of pastoral visits of Pope John Paul II
 List of pastoral visits of Pope Benedict XVI
 List of pastoral visits of Pope Francis
 List of meetings between the pope and the president of the United States
 State visit

Notes

References

External links 
 
 
 "World's Fair Photos" Pope Paul VI visits the World's Fair - audio of the NBC television feed.
 "Pope Paul VI talks at the United Nations, and sees the 'Pieta'" YouTube video of the Pope's visit to the United Nations.

1965 in New York (state)
Paul VI
Pope Paul VI
Pope Paul VI
Paul 6